

This is a list of the National Register of Historic Places listings in Montgomery County, Tennessee.

This is intended to be a complete list of the properties and districts on the National Register of Historic Places in Montgomery County, Tennessee, United States. Latitude and longitude coordinates are provided for many National Register properties and districts; these locations may be seen together in a map.

There are 53 properties and districts listed on the National Register in the county.  Another 4 properties were once listed but have been removed.

Current listings

|}

Former listings

|}

See also

 Woodstock (Trenton, Kentucky): original farm extended into Montgomery County, Tennessee
 List of National Historic Landmarks in Tennessee
 National Register of Historic Places listings in Tennessee

References

Further reading
Beach, Ursula S.  Montgomery County.  Tennessee County History Series: Robert B. Jones, ed.  Memphis: Memphis State UP, 1988.

Montgomery